Little Men is a 1998 Canadian family drama film starring Mariel Hemingway and Chris Sarandon.  It is based on the 1871 novel of the same name written by Louisa May Alcott, the author of Little Women.   It is a loose sequel to Little Women (1994).

Plot
In 1871, John Brooke meets a homeless youth named Nat Blake in Boston. He sends him to his sister-in-law, Jo Bhaer, who runs Plumfield School for Boys with her husband Fritz. Later Nat's friend Dan comes to Plumfield. Jo and Fritz allow him to stay, though he soon proves to be a troublemaker.

Cast
Mariel Hemingway as Josephine "Jo" Bhaer
Chris Sarandon as Fritz Bhaer
Michael Caloz as Nat Blake
Ben Cook as Dan
Ricky Mabe as Tommy Bangs
Gabrielle Boni as Nan Harding
Kathleen Fee as the Narrator and Molly
Michael Yarmush as Emil
Julia Garland as Daisy Brooke
B. J. McLellan as Jack Ford
Tyler Hynes as Demi Brooke

Reception
Roger Ebert gave the film one and a half stars.  Leonard Maltin gave it two and a half stars.

Home media release
On July 28, 1998, Warner Home Video and Warner Bros. Family Entertainment released the film on VHS; as part of the year-long catalog promotion, the Warner Bros. 75th Anniversary Celebration. Then on September 28, 1999, it was re-released as part of Warner's second promotion, the Century Collection. As of 2021, the film still remains unavailable on DVD or Blu-Ray.

Catalog Promotions
Warner Bros. 75th Anniversary Celebration (1998)
Century Collection (1999)
Century 2000 (2000)
Warner Spotlight (2001)

References

External links
 
 

Canadian drama films
English-language Canadian films
Films based on American novels
Films set in 1871
Films based on works by Louisa May Alcott
Films set in schools
Works based on Little Women
Little Men
Films directed by Rodney Gibbons
1990s English-language films
1990s Canadian films